Night Castle is the fifth rock opera by the Trans-Siberian Orchestra. It was released on October 28, 2009 as a double CD with a 60-page booklet illustrated by Greg Hildebrandt, and debuted at No. 5 on the Billboard charts and No. 1 on the rock music charts.  It was certified gold in eight weeks and is currently a platinum album.

Overview
The story revolves around a young child on a beach late at night, where she encounters a mysterious but non-threatening stranger. While they build a sandcastle together by the light of a bonfire, he tells her a tale that takes her all around the world and throughout history. The characters of this story include an American Vietnam War soldier named William Cozier, the Renaissance era philosopher Erasmus who is keeper of the eponymous castle of lost knowledge, and a Communist general based on the dissident Tran Do.

In 2011, Atlantic released the album on vinyl in an eight side (four disc) set in a special slip box designed to avoid the cracked corners that plague many vinyl box sets. The album includes a version of Kim Fowley's Nut Rocker as a tribute to Emerson, Lake & Palmer, who in turn had performed the song as a tribute to Tchaikovsky. Greg Lake from Emerson, Lake & Palmer honored the band by playing bass on the album.

Bonus tracks include the songs "Child of the Night" and "Believe" which, according to the band, are a glimpse into future projects.  An additional bonus track, "The Flight of Cassandra", was available exclusively online on Amazon.com, the first time that TSO had done something like this.

Savatage connections 

Some of the songs on Night Castle trace their origins to music written by Savatage, the heavy metal band from which the Trans-Siberian Orchestra evolved.

 "The Mountain" was originally recorded as "Prelude to Madness" on Savatage's Hall of the Mountain King album. The song itself is based on Edvard Grieg's In the Hall of the Mountain King with new music added in the style of Holst.
 Parts of the song "The Lion's Roar" are taken from the song "Temptation Revelation" off of the Gutter Ballet album. Parts are also from the traditional Irish song "The Minstrel Boy".
 "Mozart and Memories",  a reworking of Mozart's Symphony No. 25, was originally recorded as "Mozart and Madness" on Dead Winter Dead.
 "Believe" was originally featured on Streets: A Rock Opera; portions of it also appear in "Alone You Breathe" on Handful of Rain and "When The Crowds Are Gone" on Gutter Ballet. The version on Nightcastle includes a mix of vocalist Tim Hockenberry's vocals that were recorded in his garage and later in the studio and the only extended guitar studio contribution to TSO by Alex Skolnick.

Reception

The album was rated 2.5 stars out of 5 by Allmusic, while the site's users gave it an average rating of 3.5 stars, based on 38 reviews.

As of April, 2013, iTunes customers rated it an average of 4.5 on a scale of 1 to 5.

Track listing

Disc one

Disc two

Personnel 
 Paul O'Neill – producer
 Robert Kinkel – producer
 Dave Wittman – recording and mixing engineer

Performers

Vocals 
Solo:
 Jay Pierce – "Childhood Dreams", "The Safest Way into Tomorrow"
 Tim Hockenberry – "Sparks", "Believe"
 Jeff Scott Soto – "Night Castle", "Another Way You Can Die", "Dreams We Conceive", "Time Floats On", "The Safest Way into Tomorrow (Reprise)"
 Rob Evan – "There Was a Life", "Epiphany"
 Jennifer Cella – "Father, Son, and Holy Ghost", "Remnants of a Lullaby"
 Alexa Goddard – "Child of the Night"
 Valentina Porter – "Child of the Night"

Backup:
 Steve Broderick
 Luci Butler
 Jennifer Cella
 Britney Christian
 Rob Evan
 Dina Fanai
 Tommy Farese
 Allison Flom
 Tony Gaynor
 Christie George
 Alexa Goddard
 Kristin Lewis Gorman
 Erin Henry
 Steena Hernandez
 Kelly Keeling
 Robert Kinkel
 Danielle Landherr
 James Lewis
 Tany Ling
 Sanya Mateyas
 Ireland Wilde O'Neill
 Valentina Porter
 Andrew Ross
 Bart Shatto
 Evan Shyer
 Abby Skoff
 Zachary Stevens
 Adrienne Warren
 Scout Xavier

Guide:
 Bryan Hicks – "Epiphany"
 Dina Fanai – "Night Enchanted"
 Robert Kinkel – "Night Enchanted"

Gospel Choir:
 Keith Jacobs
 Lucille Jacobs
 Nathaniel Jacobs
 Shelia Upshaw

Child Choir:
 The American Boychoir, directed by Fernando Malvar-Ruiz

Vietnamese Dialogue:
 Truc Xuan Le
 Khanh Ong
 Nhattien Nguyen
 Nga Nguyen

Instruments 
Band:
 Paul O'Neill – Guitars
 Robert Kinkel – Keyboards
 Jon Oliva – Keyboards
 Al Pitrelli – Lead & Rhythm Guitars
 Chris Altenhoff – Bass
 Luci Butler – Keyboards
 Chris Caffery – Guitars
 Shih-Yi Chiang – Keyboards
 Roddy Chong – Violin
 Angus Clark – Guitars
 Jane Mangini – Keyboards
 Johnny Lee Middleton – Bass
 John O. Reilly – Drums
 Anna Phoebe – Strings
 Jeff Plate – Drums
 Alex Skolnick – Guitars
 Derek Wieland – Keyboards
 Dave Wittman – Drum, Guitar, & Bass Inserts

Strings:
 Roddy Chong
 Caitlin Moe
 Anna Phoebe
 Allison Zlotow
 Lowell Adams
 Karen Dumke
 Lei Liu
 Chizuko Matsusaka
 Sarah Shellman

Additional Instruments:
 Jeff Allegue – Bass
 Jay Coble – Trumpet
 Alicia Crawford – Bass
 Jason Gianni – Drums
 Peter Evans – Trumpet
 Max Johnson – Bass
 Greg Lake – Bass on "Nutrocker"
 Trey Tosh – Guitars
 Criss Oliva – Guitars on the original version of "The Mountain".

Charts

Weekly charts

Year-end charts

References

External links 
 Official Site
 Latin Mentor for Trans-Siberian Orchestra: Dr. Clement Kuehn

2009 albums
Trans-Siberian Orchestra albums
Concept albums
Rock operas
Lava Records albums
Albums produced by Paul O'Neill (rock producer)